The Packers Radio Network is a broadcast radio network and the official radio broadcaster of the Green Bay Packers, fully under the team's control in regards to technical productions and on-air personnel. The network's flagship is iHeartMedia's WRNW in Milwaukee, Wisconsin, and its coverage is also heard nationwide through NFL Game Pass, Sirius XM, and TuneIn.

The team's play-by-play announcer is Wayne Larrivee, with former Packer center Larry McCarren providing color commentary since 1995. Former Packers fullback John Kuhn serves as the network's sideline reporter.

History
The Packers radio network was previously with WTMJ, which has broadcast the games since November 24, 1929, and was the former flagship station of Journal Communications until the E. W. Scripps Company and Journal completed their broadcast merger and publishing spin-off on April 1, 2015 (Good Karma took over WTMJ's operations on November 1, 2018 upon Scripps' second withdrawal from radio). It was one of the few arrangements where a team's flagship radio station was not based in their home market and the local station served as a network affiliate only, as WTMJ's signal to Green Bay and most of Wisconsin's population centers is city-grade. Meanwhile, the rights for Packers games in the Green Bay are held by Midwest Communications's WIXX, with Cumulus Media acquiring the Fox Cities rights to the team in 2022 for WYDR, resolving an oddity in the network where former Fox Cities affiliate WAPL transmits from the same tower site as WIXX.

In situations where Milwaukee Brewers baseball playoff games conflicted with Packers games (WTMJ and Good Karma Brands originate that team's broadcasts as the Brewers Radio Network) in September and October, WTMJ's FM sister station WKTI (94.5) originated the games in Milwaukee, with other stations in the Packers Radio Network continuing to determine how to carry both games, depending on whether they have a sister station to broadcast both games.

Though its broadcasts began in 1929, WTMJ did not begin paying the Packers for broadcast rights until 1943; it paid the team $7500 to broadcast the season. In the early 1930s, there was no exclusive right given to broadcast games, and WHBY, then based in Green Bay, often sent its own announcers to call the game. From 1933 to 1936, three additional stations carried WTMJ's radio broadcasts of Packer games: WLBL in Stevens Point (a non-commercial station owned by the state commerce department decades before the creation of Wisconsin Public Radio), WTAQ in Green Bay and WKBH in La Crosse. WSAW in Wausau and WJMS in Ironwood, Michigan started carrying the feed in 1937.

On October 27, 2021, the Packers announced that its longtime association with WTMJ would end at the end of the season, and that it had signed a deal with iHeartMedia to make sports radio station "The Game", WRNW (97.3), the team's new Milwaukee radio affiliate in 2022. Packers broadcasts already aired on iHeartMedia stations in Madison, Wisconsin, Eau Claire, Wisconsin, and Moline, Illinois. Production of the Packers Radio Network had been transferred from WTMJ to the team in 2018.

Extended technical details
Two internal Part 15 radio stations are operated within the area surrounding Lambeau Field during Packers home games, utilizing a Federal Communications Commission special events low-power television license which allows the team's station partner to operate on the channel space that makes up VHF television channel 5 (not to be confused with WFRV-TV). The first features the Packers Radio Network play-by-play, along with public address and scoreboard announcements, providing the game call to those in attendance without the delay experienced by the uploading of the network feed via satellite. Another station carries the game's television network audio, also in sync with the PA/scoreboard. Both feeds are on non-standard FM frequencies below 87.5 FM MHz which require purchase of a special radio tuner from the team's pro shop to listen to that signal clearly (though it can also be received on a consumer radio/handheld television which can receive analog TV channel 5, or an extended Japanese band FM tuner which tunes below 87.5 FM), though it is audible with cross-channel interference from Wisconsin Public Radio's WPNE at 87.5 FM on regular tuners.

WIXX is considered an additional "primary" station in the network. This designation only truly comes to use in the later stages of the NFL Playoffs if the Packers make it to the NFC Championship Game and the Super Bowl, where WIXX is allowed to carry the Packers Radio Network local call. All other network stations, including those licensed to communities in the Fox Cities, must carry the national Westwood One call instead in line with NFL rules, which included WAPL in the past, despite transmitting from the same tower site as WIXX.

Programming format and announcers
Its primary programming consists of broadcasts of Packer home and away games to a network of 56 stations in Wisconsin, the U.P., Iowa, North Dakota, and South Dakota, along with a two-hour pre-game show and three-hour postgame show which allows listeners to call, email, or text in a sports talk format about the finished game. Wayne Larrivee has been the play-by-play announcer since 1999, while former Packer center Larry McCarren has worked as the color commentator since 1995. Both Larrivee and McCarren contribute to the team's television programs, in addition to work with Spectrum News 1 statewide, WTMJ-TV in Milwaukee and WGBA-TV in Green Bay, where McCarren was sports director from 2013 until 2015 when he began to focus exclusively on his Packers network duties.

WRNW is the current Milwaukee station airing Learfield coverage of Wisconsin Badgers sports, and its sister stations WOKY (920) and WRIT-FM (95.7) already handle conflict situations between the Badger football and men's basketball teams, giving the Packers contractually-steady coverage throughout the season on WRNW on a full-market FM signal (through full-market stations and FM translators of AM stations and migration of AM stations over to full-power FM stations, Packers play-by-play has shifted to that band throughout the network, as with most of the league's teams). The shift away from WTMJ (whose transmitter is based in the Racine County community of Union Grove, de facto giving Racine and Kenosha a very strong signal) also compelled the team to add a Racine/Kenosha station to the network for the first time in WRJN to make up for WRNW's transmitter position being stronger to the north in the market than the south.

Announcers
Russ Winnie: 1929–1957
Ted Moore: 1958–1969
Jim Irwin: 1969–1998
Gary Bender: 1970–1974
Lionel Aldridge: 1975–1979
Max McGee: 1979–1998
Larry McCarren: 1995–present
Wayne Larrivee: 1999–present

Station list

Blue background indicates low-power FM translator.

References



National Football League on the radio
Radio Network

Sports radio networks in the United States